S19 may refer to:

Aircraft 
 Letov Š-19, a Czechoslovak airliner
 Rans S-19 Venterra, an American light sport aircraft
 Short S.19 Singapore III, a British flying boat
 SIAI S.19, an Italian racing flying boat
 Sikorsky S-19, an experimental Russian biplane

Rail and transit 
 S19 (Rhine-Ruhr S-Bahn), an S-Bahn line in Germany
 S19 (ZVV), a line of the Zürich S-Bahn in Switzerland
 Aioiyama Station, in Midori-ku, Nagoya, Aichi, Japan
 Mizue Station, in Edogawa, Tokyo, Japan
 Niki Station, in Yoichi District, Hokkaido, Japan,
 Tsuruhashi Station, in Osaka, Japan

Roads 
 S19 Xinnong–Jinshanwei Expressway, China
 Expressway S19 (Poland)
 County Route S19 (California), United States

Other uses 
 40S ribosomal protein S19
 , a submarine of the Royal Navy
 SREC (file format), an ASCII encoding format for binary data developed by Motorola
 , a submarine of the United States Navy
 British NVC community S19, a swamps and tall-herb fen community in the British National Vegetation Classification system